Emin Narimanovitch Sefershaev is a Russian Greco-Roman wrestler of Crimean Tatar heritage. In 2021, he became European champion in the 55 kg event at the 2021 European Wrestling Championships in Warsaw, Poland and he won the silver medal in this event at the 2021 World Wrestling Championships in Oslo, Norway.

Career 

In 2019, he won the silver medal in the 55 kg event at the World U23 Wrestling Championship in Budapest, Hungary. In 2020, he won the gold medal in the 55 kg event at the Individual Wrestling World Cup held in Belgrade, Serbia.

In March 2021, he won the gold medal in the 60 kg event at the Matteo Pellicone Ranking Series 2021 held in Rome, Italy. In April 2021, he won the gold medal in the 55 kg event at the European Wrestling Championships held in Warsaw, Poland.

Major results

References

External links 

 

Living people
Year of birth missing (living people)
Place of birth missing (living people)
Russian male sport wrestlers
European Wrestling Championships medalists
World Wrestling Championships medalists
European Wrestling Champions